HMNZS Maori (P3570) was a Fairmile B Motor Launch of the Royal New Zealand Navy

Originally commissioned on 20 December 1943 with pennant number Q 409, she was part of the 80th Motor Launch Flotilla. Early in 1944 she went to the Solomon Islands where she served under the operational control of COMSOPAC. After the end of the war she was sold.

In 1953 she was repurchased and recommissioned as HMNZS Maori (P3570).

In 1963 she was sold again and became the Auckland-Waiheke ferry Iris Moana.

References

Further reading

See also
 
 New Zealand Coastal Forces of World War II

Patrol vessels of the Royal New Zealand Navy
1943 ships